Rosalind Mary Coggon is an English scientist who is a Royal Society University Research Fellow at the University of Southampton. She is the co-editor of the 2050 Science Framework, which guides multidisciplinary subseafloor research. She was awarded the 2021 American Geophysical Union Asahiko Taira International Scientific Ocean Drilling Research Prize.

Early life and education 
Coggon was an undergraduate student at the University of Cambridge, where she studied natural sciences. She moved to the University of Southampton as a doctoral researcher in 2001. Her research considered hydrothermal alteration of ocean crust on Macquarie Island. Her doctoral research involved field work on Macquarie as part of the Australian National Antarctic Research Expeditions (ANARE). After graduating she was made a postdoctoral research scientist at the University of Michigan. She returned to the United Kingdom in 2007, where she was appointed a postdoctoral researcher at Imperial College London. By studying the calcium carbonate veins that form in rocks beneath the seafloor, Coggon showed that the chemical composition of oceans varied considerably over geological time.

Research and career 
In 2010, Coggon was awarded a Royal Society Dorothy Hodgkin Fellowship and she moved to the University of Southampton. She was made a Royal Society University Research Fellow in 2018. Her research considers the role of fluids in the evolution of the ocean crust, and the quantification of chemical exchanges between the ageing crust and the overlying oceans.

Coggon is co-editor of the International Ocean Discovery Program 2050 Science Framework: Exploring Earth by Scientific Ocean Drilling, which guides multidisciplinary subseafloor research.  The framework identifies research frontiers that can only be achieved through ocean drilling. It has a thirty-year outlook and looks to achieve state-of-the-art scientific ocean drilling into the mid-21st century.

Coggon was awarded the Asahiko Taira International Scientific Ocean Drilling Research Prize in 2021. The prize, which honours contributions to scientific ocean drilling, is given in partnership between the American Geophysical Union and Japan Geoscience Union.

Selected publications

References 

English oceanographers
Women oceanographers
Living people
Year of birth missing (living people)
Alumni of the University of Southampton
Alumni of the University of Cambridge
Academics of the University of Southampton